The Brownsville Carnegie Library, at 121 W Main St. in Brownsville, Tennessee, was listed on the National Register of Historic Places in 2018.

It is a Carnegie library, funded by a $7,500 grant December 2, 1909.  It was built during 1910-1912 and was open as a library from 1912 to 2002.  It was rehabbed in 1993.  It is now a Chamber of Commerce building.  It was possibly designed by Neander M. Woods, Jr. of Memphis.

See also
Brownsville Children’s Library, Brooklyn, New York, also a Carnegie library

References

Carnegie libraries in Tennessee
National Register of Historic Places in Haywood County, Tennessee
Neoclassical architecture in Tennessee
Library buildings completed in 1912